The Breda 51 was an Italian multi-purpose off-road vehicle developed in the 1930s.

History
The first prototype of a truck suitable for all types of terrain was presented by Società Italiana Ernesto Breda to the Studies and Experiences Office in December 1936. The assessments continued until 1938, including tests in Italian East Africa. The outcome was positive and after some essentially aesthetic modifications, 48 were ordered by the ministry.
In parallel, it was adopted by the Royal Army, which used it on all fronts during the Second World War and, after the end of the conflict, by the Italian Army.

Technology
The configuration is the 3-axle with advanced cab, common to the Dovunque vehicle family, such as the Fiat Dovunque 33,  Fiat-SPA Dovunque 35 and SPA Dovunque 41. Traction is 6x4, on the two rear axles with twin wheels. The spare wheels were keyed in neutral between the first and second axles, as on all Dovunque vehicles, to facilitate the overcoming of obstacles.

Versions
The Royal Army adopted it in the version with a reduced and more spartan cabin, the 'Breda 51' 'Colonial', used as a heavy artillery tractor for troops located mainly in Libya. In 1941 a model was produced with stronger chassis frame, the  'Breda 52, '  destined to become the basis for the later trucks.

Related items
 Autocannone Breda 52 da 90/53

References 

World War II vehicles of Italy
Military vehicles of Italy